The purpose of this timeline is to give a detailed account of Buddhism from the birth of Gautama Buddha to the present.

Timeline

Dates

6th–5th century BCE

4th century BCE

3rd century BCE

2nd century BCE

1st century BCE

1st century

2nd century

3rd century

4th century

5th century

6th century

7th century

8th century

9th century

10th century

11th century

12th century

13th century

14th century

15th century

16th century

17th century

18th century

19th century

20th century

21st century

See also
 History of Buddhism
 History of Hinduism
 Ordination of women in Buddhism
 Silk Road transmission of Buddhism
 Timeline of Jainism
 Timeline of Zen Buddhism in the United States

References

Sources

Printed sources

Web-sources

External links
 Theravada Buddhist Chronology
 Asakawa, K and Lodge, Henry Cabot (Ed.). Japan From the Japanese Government History. (In Progress at Project Gutenberg)
 Buddhist Bark Texts Found, BuddhaNet.
 A Buddhist Time-line
 Rock cut canon in China
 First Sri Lankan Buddhist mission to Germany 1957

 
Buddhism